This is a list of women artists who were born in the Vietnam or whose artworks are closely associated with that country.

B 
 Thi Bui (born 1975), Vietnamese-born American graphic novelist, illustrator

C 
 Tiffany Chung (born 1969), Vietnamese-born American multimedia and installation artist
 Cong Kim Hoa (born 1962), lacquer painter

D 
 Thuy Diep, Vietnamese-born American fashion designer
 Dao Droste (born 1952), Vietnamese-born German sculptor, painter, and installation artist

E 
 Maika Elan (born 1986), photographer

H 
 Đặng Thị Minh Hạnh (born 1961), fashion designer
 Vũ Giáng Hương (1930–2011), painter, known for silk paintings

K 
 Lim Khim Katy (born 1978), painter, of Chinese-Cambodian and Vietnamese descent

L 
 Thao Lam, Vietnamese-born Canadian children's book illustrator, author

M 
 Lê Hiền Minh (born 1979), Dó paper installations, sculptor

P 
 Thảo Nguyên Phan (born 1987), painter, filmmaker, and installation artist
 LeUyen Pham (born 1973), children's book illustrator, author

T 
 Điềm Phùng Thị (1920–2002), modernist sculptor
 Nguyễn Thu Thủy (born 1971), mosaicist, and ceramist
 Thu Van Tran (born 1979), Vietnamese-born French sculptor and installation artist

See also 
 List of Vietnamese people
 List of Vietnamese artists

-
Vietnamese
Artists
Artists, women